Glasgow Central is a constituency of the House of Commons of the Parliament of the United Kingdom (at Westminster). In its current form, the constituency was first used at the 2005 general election, but there was also a Glasgow Central constituency that existed from 1885 to 1997. The sitting MP is Alison Thewliss of the Scottish National Party (SNP), who was first elected in May 2015. This constituency was also the seat of the former Conservative Prime Minister Bonar Law, who was the shortest-serving UK Prime Minister of the twentieth century.

Boundaries 

1885–1918: The Seventh, Eighth, Ninth, Twelfth, and Thirteenth Municipal Wards.

1918–1950: "That portion of the city which is bounded by a line commencing at a point at the intersection of the centre lines of Parliamentary Road and Castle Street, thence southward along the centre line of Castle Street to the centre line of Alexandra Parade, thence eastward along the centre line of Alexandra Parade to the centre line of Firpark Street, thence southward along the centre line of Firpark Street and Ark Lane to the centre line of Duke Street, thence westward along the centre line of Duke Street to the centre line of Sydney Street, thence southward along the centre line of Sydney Street to the centre line of Gallowgate, thence westward along the centre line of Gallowgate to the centre line of Saltmarket, thence southward along the centre line of Saltmarket and Albert Bridge to the centre line of the River Clyde, thence westward along the centre line of the River Clyde to a point in line with the centre line of McAlpine Street, thence northward along the centre line of McAlpine Street, Pitt Street and Scott Street to the centre line of New City Road, thence south-eastward along the centre line of New City Road and Cowcaddens to the centre line of Buchanan Street, thence southward along the centre line of Buchanan Street to the centre line of Parliamentary Road, thence north-eastward along the centre line of Parliamentary Road to the point of commencement."

1950–1974: The County of the City of Glasgow wards of Cowcaddens and Townhead, and part of Exchange ward.

1974–1983: The County of the City of Glasgow wards of Calton, Dalmarnock, Exchange, and Townhead.

1983–1997: The City of Glasgow District electoral divisions of Central/Calton, Kingston/Hutchesontown, and Queen's Park/Crosshill.

2005–present: The Glasgow City wards of Anderston, Bridgeton/Dalmarnock, Calton, Govanhill, Hutchesontown, Kelvingrove, Kingston, Merchant City, Pollokshields East, Strathbungo, and Toryglen.

Glasgow Central is now one of seven constituencies covering the Glasgow City council area. All are entirely within the council area. Prior to the 2005 general election, the city area was covered by ten constituencies, of which two straddled boundaries with other council areas.

The Central constituency, as defined in 2005, includes parts of the former Glasgow Govan, Glasgow Kelvin, Glasgow Shettleston, Glasgow Pollok and Glasgow Rutherglen constituencies. Scottish Parliament constituencies for the area are predominantly Glasgow Southside on the South of the river and Glasgow Kelvin on the North of the river, with Calton, Bridgeton and Dalmarnock areas of Glasgow Shettleston as well as a single polling place each from Glasgow Cathcart and Glasgow Provan.

The new Central constituency sits across the River Clyde, and includes the areas of Kelvingrove, Anderston, Merchant City, Calton, Pollokshields, Gorbals and Govanhill.

Constituency profile 
The constituency takes in Glasgow city centre to the north, including Kelvingrove Art Gallery, the main railway stations, Glasgow Cathedral and the Scottish Exhibition and Conference Centre. It is home to both Strathclyde and Caledonian Universities, as well as the Royal Conservatoire of Scotland (formerly the Royal Scottish Academy of Music and Drama and still often referred to locally as RSAMD) and the Glasgow School of Art. It also houses a significant number of students attending the University of Glasgow, which is just over the boundary in Glasgow North. The large student population is an important factor in elections, and the presence of four degree-awarding institutions as well as a significant portion of the student body of a fifth has led to claims that it is the best-educated constituency in the United Kingdom. The Merchant City is also here, yuppie housing built out of the disused cotton and tobacco warehouses. This area is a symbol of the rebirth of the city.

At the heart of the constituency is the River Clyde, marking the boundaries of Glasgow Central from the Commonwealth Arena and Sir Chris Hoy Velodrome and Oatlands in the east of the constituency, to Glasgow Science Centre and Glasgow's Riverside Museum to the west. There is some deprived areas within the seat itself though it is mostly an affluent area.

Glasgow Central is estimated to have voted to Remain in the European Union by 66.6% in the 2016 referendum on the UK's membership of the EU.

Members of Parliament

Election results

Elections in the 2010s

Flora Scarabello was suspended by the Scottish Conservatives after alleged Islamophobia. Because nominations had closed at the time of her suspension, she still appeared on the ballot paper as the Conservative candidate.

Elections in the 2000s

Elections in the 1990s

Elections in the 1980s

Elections in the 1970s

Elections in the 1960s

Elections in the 1950s

Elections in the 1940s

Elections in the 1930s

Elections in the 1920s

Elections in the 1910s

Elections in the 1900s

Elections in the 1890s

Elections in the 1880s

See also 
 Politics of Glasgow

References

♯ This reference gives all recent Glasgow City Westminster election results. You select the year and then the constituency to view the result.

Westminster Parliamentary constituencies in Scotland
Constituencies of the Parliament of the United Kingdom established in 1885
Constituencies of the Parliament of the United Kingdom disestablished in 1997
Constituencies of the Parliament of the United Kingdom established in 2005
Constituencies of the Parliament of the United Kingdom represented by a sitting Prime Minister
Politics of Glasgow
Bridgeton–Calton–Dalmarnock
Gorbals
Govanhill and Crosshill